The 2018 UEFA Futsal Championship, commonly referred to as UEFA Futsal Euro 2018, was the 11th edition of the UEFA Futsal Championship, the international futsal championship organised by UEFA for the men's national teams of Europe. It was hosted for the first time in Slovenia, following a decision of the UEFA Executive Committee on 26 January 2015. Slovenia was chosen ahead of other bids from Macedonia and Romania.

The final tournament was contested from 30 January to 10 February and comprised 12 teams, eleven of which joined the hosts Slovenia after overcoming a qualifying tournament. Matches took place at the Arena Stožice in Ljubljana. In their second appearance in the competition's final after 2010, Portugal defeated seven-time winners and defending champions Spain 3–2, after extra-time, to win their first European title.

This was the last tournament to be held on a two-year basis and featuring 12 teams, as the competition will be played every four years, starting from 2022, and include 16 teams.

Qualification

A total of 48 UEFA nations entered the competition (including Germany and Kosovo which entered for the first time), and with the hosts Slovenia qualifying automatically, the other 47 teams competed in the qualifying competition to determine the remaining 11 spots in the final tournament. The qualifying competition, which took place from January to September 2017, consisted of three rounds:
Preliminary round: The 26 lowest-ranked teams were drawn into seven groups – five groups of four teams and two groups of three teams. Each group was played in single round-robin format at one of the pre-selected hosts. The seven group winners advanced to the main round.
Main round: The 28 teams (21 highest-ranked teams and seven preliminary round qualifiers) were drawn into seven groups of four teams. Each group was played in single round-robin format at one of the pre-selected hosts. The seven group winners qualified directly to the final tournament, while the seven runners-up and the best third-placed team advanced to the play-offs.
Play-offs: The eight teams were drawn into four ties to play home-and-away two-legged matches to determine the last four qualified teams.

Qualified teams
The following 12 teams qualified for the final tournament.

Final draw
The final draw was held on 29 September 2017, 12:00 CEST (UTC+2), at Ljubljana Castle in Ljubljana, Slovenia. The 12 teams were drawn into four groups of three teams. Hosts Slovenia were assigned to position A1 in the draw, and the remaining teams were seeded according to their coefficient ranking, except that title holders Spain were automatically placed into Pot 1.

Each group contained one team from Pot 1, one team from Pot 2, and one team from Pot 3. For political reasons, Russia and Ukraine could not be drawn in the same group or in groups scheduled to be played on the same day (due to a potential clash of teams and clash of fans). Therefore, if Russia were drawn in Group B, Ukraine had to be drawn in Group C or D, and if Russia were drawn in Group C or D, Ukraine had to be drawn in Group A or B.

Venues

All matches were played at the 12,480-capacity for futsal matches Arena Stožice in Ljubljana.

Match officials
A total of 16 match officials were appointed for the final tournament.

Saša Tomić (Croatia)
Ondřej Černý (Czech Republic)
Marc Birkett (England)
Timo Onatsu (Finland)
Cédric Pelissier (France)
Balázs Farkas (Hungary)
Gábor Kovács (Hungary)
Angelo Galante (Italy)
Alessandro Malfer (Italy)
Eduardo Fernandes Coelho (Portugal)
Bogdan Sorescu (Romania)
Vladimir Kadykov (Russia)
Admir Zahovič (Slovenia)
Juan José Cordero Gallardo (Spain)
Alejandro Martínez Flores (Spain)
Kamil Çetin (Turkey)

Squads

Each national team have to submit a squad of 14 players, two of whom must be goalkeepers. If a player is injured or ill severely enough to prevent his participation in the tournament before his team's first match, he can be replaced by another player.

Group stage
The final tournament schedule was confirmed on 16 October 2017.

The group winners and runners-up advance to the quarter-finals.

Tiebreakers
Teams are ranked according to points (3 points for a win, 1 point for a draw, 0 points for a loss), and if tied on points, the following tiebreaking criteria are applied, in the order given, to determine the rankings (Regulations Articles 19.01 and 19.02):
Points in head-to-head matches among tied teams;
Goal difference in head-to-head matches among tied teams;
Goals scored in head-to-head matches among tied teams;
If more than two teams are tied, and after applying all head-to-head criteria above, a subset of teams are still tied, all head-to-head criteria above are reapplied exclusively to this subset of teams;
Goal difference in all group matches;
Goals scored in all group matches;
Penalty shoot-out if only two teams have the same number of points, and they met in the last round of the group and are tied after applying all criteria above (not used if more than two teams have the same number of points, or if their rankings are not relevant for qualification for the next stage);
Disciplinary points (red card = 3 points, yellow card = 1 point, expulsion for two yellow cards in one match = 3 points);
Drawing of lots.

All times are local, CET (UTC+1).

Group A

Group B

Group C

Group D

Knockout stage
If a match is drawn after 40 minutes of regular play, an extra time consisting of two five-minute periods is played. If teams are still leveled after extra time, a penalty shoot-out is used to determine the winner. In the third place match, the extra time is skipped and the decision goes directly to kicks from the penalty mark (Regulations Articles 20.02 and 20.03).

Bracket

Quarter-finals

Semi-finals

Third place match

Final

Ranking and statistics

Final ranking

All-star squad
Top five players are bolded.

Awards

Goalscorers
7 goals

 Ricardinho

6 goals

 Bruno Coelho

5 goals

 Eder Lima

4 goals

 Douglas Jr.
 Pedro Cary

3 goals

 Bolinha
 Taynan da Silva
 Serik Zhamankulov
 Pola

2 goals

 Everton Cardoso
 Abdessamad Mohammed
 Souheil Mouhoudine
 André Coelho
 Dragan Tomić
 Igor Osredkar
 Marc Tolrà
 Taras Korolyshyn
 Petro Shoturma

1 goal

 Eduardo
 Samir Alla
 Landry N'Gala
 Massimo De Luca
 Humberto Honorio
 Leo Higuita
 Birzhan Orazov
 Mikhail Pershin
 Pavel Taku
 Michał Kubik
 Dominik Solecki
 Tiago Brito
 Fábio Cecílio
 Nílson Miguel
 Pany Varela
 Florin Ignat
 Dumitru Stoica
 Sávio Valadares
 Ivan Chishkala
 Robinho
 Slobodan Rajčević
 Denis Ramić
 Alen Fetić
 Gašper Vrhovec
 Adolfo
 Bebe
 Joselito
 Lin
 Miguelín
 Solano
 Oleksandr Pediash
 Volodymyr Razuvanov

1 own goal

 Azdine Aigoun (playing against Spain)
 Chingiz Yesenamanov (playing against Spain)
 Carlos Ortiz (playing against France)

References

External links

UEFA Futsal Euro history: 2017/18
UEFA Futsal EURO Slovenia 2018, UEFA.com
UEFA Futsal EURO Slovenia 2018 tournament website 

 
2018
2018 Uefa Futsal Euro
Uefa
2017–18 in Slovenian football
Sport in Ljubljana
January 2018 sports events in Europe
February 2018 sports events in Europe